The 2014 North Miami mayoral special election took place on November 4, 2014, to elect the mayor of North Miami, Florida. The election was officially nonpartisan. The election was held after the arrest of Mayor Lucie Tonderou earlier in 2014.  Smith Joseph was elected after a runoff election between him and former mayor Kevin Burns. The first round was held on August 26, 2014.

Candidates
Smith Joseph - Owner of a medical practice (Democratic Party)

Kevin Burns - Mayor from 2005 to 2009 (Democratic Party)

Jean Rodrique Marcellus - District 3 Councilman 2009 to 2013 (Democratic Party)

First Round Results

References

2014
2014 United States mayoral elections
2014 Florida elections
November 2014 events in the United States
United States mayoral special elections
Florida special elections